Nottinghamshire County Council elections are held every four years. Nottinghamshire County Council is the upper-tier authority for the non-metropolitan county of Nottinghamshire in England. Since the last boundary changes in 2017, 66 county councillors have been elected from 56 electoral divisions.

Political control
Nottinghamshire County Council was first created in 1889. Its powers and responsibilities were significantly reformed under the Local Government Act 1972, with a new council elected in 1973 to act as a shadow authority ahead of the new powers coming into force in 1974. Since 1973, political control of the council has been held by the following parties:

Leadership
The leaders of the council since 2003 have been:

Council elections
 1973 Nottinghamshire County Council election
 1977 Nottinghamshire County Council election
 1981 Nottinghamshire County Council election
 1985 Nottinghamshire County Council election
 1989 Nottinghamshire County Council election
 1993 Nottinghamshire County Council election
 1997 Nottinghamshire County Council election
 2001 Nottinghamshire County Council election
 2005 Nottinghamshire County Council election (boundary changes increased the number of seats by 4)
 2009 Nottinghamshire County Council election
 2013 Nottinghamshire County Council election
 2017 Nottinghamshire County Council election
 2021 Nottinghamshire County Council election

County result maps

By-election results

1997-2001

2001-2005

2005-2009

2012-2016

2016-2022

2022-present

References

External links
Nottinghamshire County Council

 
Council elections in the East Midlands
Council elections in Nottinghamshire
County council elections in England